Operation Inland Seas (or Sea) was a United States Navy operation to celebrate the completion of the Saint Lawrence Seaway in 1959. 
Task Force 47 (TF 47), a 28-ship detachment of the U.S. Atlantic Fleet under the command of Rear Admiral Edmund B. Taylor, sailed up the Saint Lawrence River to participate in the official opening of the Seaway by Queen Elizabeth II of Canada and U.S. President Dwight D. Eisenhower on June 26, 1959. 
Thereafter, the ships visited ports throughout the Great Lakes, sometimes escorting Queen Elizabeth aboard HMY Britannia.

Participating U.S. Navy ships

External links 

Inland Seas
1959 in the United States
1959 in Canada
Canada–United States relations
Saint Lawrence Seaway